Hepatocystis bainae is a species of parasitic alveolates belonging to the phylum Apicomplexia

Species in this genus are parasitic unicellular eukaryotes transmitted by flies of the genus Culicoides and infect mammals.

History
This species was described in 1977 by Mialhe and Landau.

Geographical distribution
This species is found in Malaysia.

Description
The hepatic schizonts are small and the colloid is repartitioned. It is most similar morphologically to Hepatocystis rodhaini.

Host record
This species infects Cantor's roundleaf bat (Hipposideros galeritus).

References

Parasites of Diptera
Parasites of bats
Haemosporida